The 2016 Green Bay Packers season was their 98th season overall, 96th season in the National Football League, and the 11th under head coach Mike McCarthy. Despite a 4–6 start to the season, the Packers went on a 6-game winning streak to finish the regular season with a 10–6 record. The team clinched the NFC North for the fifth time in six years with their week 17 win over the Detroit Lions. They routed the fifth-seeded New York Giants 38–13 in the wild card round of the playoffs and defeated the top-seeded and heavily favored Dallas Cowboys 34–31 in the divisional round of the playoffs, but their season came to an end when they were beat by the second-seeded Atlanta Falcons in the NFC Championship Game 44–21.

Offseason

Free agents

Draft

Notes
 As the result of a negative differential in free agent signings and departures that the Packers experienced during the  free agency period, the team received two compensatory selections for the 2016 draft. Free agent transactions that occurred after May 12, 2015 did not impact the team's formula for determining compensatory selections for the 2016 draft.
Thompson traded three picks to the Indianapolis Colts for their second round (48th overall) and selected Jason Spriggs. Thompson traded the Packers' second round pick (57th overall) a fourth-round pick (125th) and a seventh-round pick (248th).

Undrafted free agents
All undrafted free agents were signed after the 2016 NFL draft on April 30, unless noted otherwise.

Staff

Final roster

Starters

Regular season

Offense

Defense

Playoffs

Offense

Defense

Standings

Division

Conference

Schedule

Preseason
On February 16, the NFL announced that the Packers would play the Indianapolis Colts in the Pro Football Hall of Fame Game. The game would have occurred on Sunday, August 7, at Tom Benson Hall of Fame Stadium in Canton, Ohio, but was cancelled due to field conditions. However, the two teams met during the regular season in Green Bay.

The remainder of the Packers' preseason opponents and schedule were announced on April 7.

Regular season

Note: Intra-division opponents are in bold text.

Postseason

Game summaries

Regular season

Week 1: at Jacksonville Jaguars

Week 2: at Minnesota Vikings

Week 3: vs. Detroit Lions

Week 4: Bye week
No game. Green Bay had their bye week on Week 4.

Week 5: vs. New York Giants

Week 6: vs. Dallas Cowboys

The Packers wore their throwback uniforms for this game.

The Dallas defense forced four Green Bay turnovers. It was the first time since 2008, and second time in Cowboys history, that Dallas had won at Lambeau.

This was the Packers first loss wearing throwback uniforms.

Week 7: vs. Chicago Bears

For the first time since 1989, the Packers wore their white jerseys at a home game. As part of the NFL Color Rush, they wore white jerseys and white pants for the first time.

Week 8: at Atlanta Falcons
 Despite Aaron Rodgers throwing for 4 touchdowns and the team holding a 32–26 lead with less than a minute left in the game, Matt Ryan threw a game-sealing touchdown pass to wide receiver Mohamed Sanu to stun Green Bay. The Packers drop to 4-3 after the last-second loss.

Week 9: vs. Indianapolis Colts
 Despite Aaron Rodgers throwing for 3 touchdowns and just one interception, the Colts got their first victory at Lambeau since 1988 with a 31–26 win. The Packers drop to 4–4 with the loss.

Week 10: at Tennessee Titans

Week 11: at Washington Redskins
 The Packers fell to 4-6 for the first time since 2006. Days later, Aaron Rodgers coined the phrase "Run The Table", which the Packers did by going on an 8-game winning streak (6 regular-season, 2 playoff) that lasted until the NFC Championship against the Falcons.

Week 12: at Philadelphia Eagles

With the 27–13 win, the Packers improved to 5–6. This was the start of an eight-game winning streak going into the NFC Championship against the Falcons.

Week 13: vs. Houston Texans

The Packers beat the Texans for the first time at home 21–13 to improve to 6–6 at a snowy Lambeau Field. With the Texans' loss, no team has an undefeated record at Lambeau. This was also the first time the Packers had beaten a Houston NFL team at home.

Week 14: vs. Seattle Seahawks

The Packers intercepted Russell Wilson a career-high five times as the Packers routed the Seahawks 38–10 to improve to 7–6. Aaron Rodgers, with his 3:0 TD-INT ratio in this game, posted a 150.8 passer rating, the highest allowed by the Seattle defense (which was without safety Earl Thomas, who was out for the year with a broken leg) since Pete Carroll became the Seahawks' head coach in 2010.

Week 15: at Chicago Bears

The Packers led 27–10, but the Bears came back and tied the game at 27. Aaron Rodgers then threw a 60-yard pass to Jordy Nelson to set up a Mason Crosby field goal to win 30–27 and improve to 8–6.

The Packers tied the series with the Bears for the first time since 1933.

Week 16: vs. Minnesota Vikings

The Packers defeated the reeling Vikings 38–25 to improve to 9–6 as Rodgers became the first quarterback to throw for 300 yards against the Vikings defense. With the win, the Packers eliminated the now 7-8 Vikings from the playoffs.

Week 17: at Detroit Lions

The Packers successfully ran the table as they improved to 10–6 and won the NFC North, matching last year's record.

Postseason

NFC Wild Card Playoffs: vs. (5) New York Giants

The Packers hosted the fifth seeded New York Giants, who defeated the Packers at Lambeau in the 2007 and 2011 playoffs. It was also a rematch of week five, which was won by the Packers 23–16. The Giants had one of the best defenses in the NFL going into the game, but Rodgers threw for 4 touchdowns, including a 42-yard Hail Mary pass to Cobb at the end of the first half as the Packers would lead 14–6. The Packers went on to rout the Giants 38–13 and would travel to face the top-seeded Cowboys.

NFC Divisional Playoffs: at (1) Dallas Cowboys

This game was a rematch of week six, a game the Packers lost 16–30. However, unlike the previous meeting of these two teams, the Packers were expected to give the Cowboys difficulties. Dallas clinched the #1 seed as well as home-field advantage, but the Packers were able to prevail and upset the Cowboys with a Mason Crosby field goal as time expired 34–31.

NFC Championship: at (2) Atlanta Falcons

This was the end of an 8-game winning streak for the Packers as they were crushed 44–21. The Packers were scoreless until they scored a touchdown when they were behind 31–0 as Atlanta took an early 7–0 lead and never trailed from there. Green Bay's 24-0 halftime deficit was also then the largest deficit Aaron Rodgers had faced in his entire career. This would later be surpassed with the 27-0 halftime deficit the Packers would face in the 2019 NFC Championship, which resulted in a 37-20 loss to the San Francisco 49ers.

Statistics

Regular season statistical leaders

Playoffs statistical leaders

Best game performances

League rankings

Awards

References

External links

Green Bay
Green Bay Packers seasons
Green Bay Packers
NFC North championship seasons